Hagada Hasmalit (Hebrew: , "The Left Bank") is an Israel radical left-wing website. First published in Hebrew in Spring 2002, an English version began to be published in March 2007.

Hagada Hasmalit features articles and commentary by Jewish Israelis, Arab Israelis, and Palestinians from an anti-Zionist, Marxist or anarchist perspective. The magazine opposes continuing the Israeli presence in the Israeli-occupied territories, and critique social and economic issues inside Israel.

Hagada Hasmalit supported various campaigns over the years including the campaign to free Mordechai Vanunu, the struggle against the Israeli West Bank barrier in Bil'in, Tali Fahima and the refuseniks.

Hagada Hasmalit is also a club run by the Maki, the Israeli communist party, at 70 Ahad Ha'am Street, Tel Aviv. The Hagada club hosts jazz evenings, film showings, lectures and performances. Some of the members of the club launched the website.

References

External links
Official website

2002 establishments in Israel
Anti-Zionism in Israel
Political magazines published in Israel
Non-governmental organizations involved in the Israeli–Palestinian conflict
Magazines established in 2002
Socialist magazines
Far-left politics in Israel